J50 may refer to:

Vehicles 
 Beechcraft J50 Twin Bonanza, an American civil utility aircraft
 Ferrari J50, an Italian sports car
 , a minesweeper of the Royal Navy
 Infiniti QX50 (J50), a Japanese SUV
 LNER Class J50, a British steam locomotive class
 Toyota Land Cruiser (J50), a Japanese off-road vehicle

Other uses 
 Biaugmented triangular prism
 Scarlet (orca), a killer whale